Rampally is a village  in Nagaram Municipality falls under Keesara mandal of Medchal-Malkajgiri district in Telangana, India. It is emerging as one of the most sought out places for residential layouts and independent houses in North-Eastern part of Hyderabad. The close proximity to Pocharam, IT Park in Ghatkesar has led to a sudden increase in population in this area.

References

Villages in Ranga Reddy district